Javier Adelmar Zanetti (born 10 August 1973) is an Argentine former professional footballer. He is regarded as one of the best players of his generation, and is especially well known for his role in Inter Milan's treble-winning 2009–10 season. Zanetti was known for his versatility as well as his adeptness on both the left and right wing, having played as a full-back on both flanks in addition to being a midfielder. He is currently the Vice-President of Inter.

He started his career in Argentina, first with Talleres, and then Banfield. From 1995 to 2014 he played for Italian club Inter Milan and was captain from 2001 until his retirement in 2014.

Having participated in 1,115 official games, he is on the list of men's footballers with the most official appearances. He is also the foreign player with the most appearances in Serie A (615), and holds the fourth-most appearances in the league, behind only Gianluigi Buffon, Paolo Maldini and Francesco Totti. He holds the record for the most appearances in the history of Inter (858), as well as the record for the most trophies won with the club, with 16: five Scudetti, four Coppa Italia, four Supercoppa Italiana, one UEFA Cup, one Champions League and the FIFA Club World Cup. He also has the most appearances as captain in the Champions League (82).

With the Argentina national team he played in 145 games, a figure that makes him the third player with the most appearances in the history of La Albiceleste, having held the record from 2007 to 2018. With Argentina he reached the final of the Copa América in 2004 and 2007, and the Confederations Cup in 1995 and 2005.

On retiring, Inter Milan retired his number 4 jersey and named him as its vice president. He has been named an ambassador for the SOS Children's Villages project in Argentina by FIFA, and in 2005 he received the Ambrogino d'Oro award from the city of Milan for his social initiatives. Zanetti is also a Global Ambassador for the Special Olympics.

Early life 
Javier Adelmar Zanetti was born in Buenos Aires to working-class parents of Italian ancestry and grew up in the harbour area in the Dock Sud district, one of the city's most notorious areas. His father Rodolfo was a bricklayer and his mother Violeta Bonnazola was a cleaner. Reportedly some of Zanetti's ancestors were Italian settlers brought to southern Chile by Giorgio Ricci in the aftermath of the Occupation of Araucanía (1861-1883). He began playing football on a field in the city suburbs, maintaining the pitch in his spare time. When he was a teenager, he tried out for local club Independiente's youth academy but was ultimately rejected and told that he lacked the physique to succeed in the game. Instead, he concentrated on school and worked as an assistant to his father with masonry as well as odd jobs such as delivering milk and helping out at a relative's grocery store.

Club career

Talleres 
After his rejection from Independiente, Zanetti signed for Talleres, then a second division team. With them, he played 33 matches and scored one goal in his only season, before moving in 1993 to the First Division club Banfield.

Banfield 
A 20-year-old Zanetti debuted for Banfield on 12 September 1993 in a home match against River Plate. He scored his first goal 17 days later against Newell's Old Boys in a match that ended 1–1. His outstanding performances for Banfield gained popularity from El Taladro fans and also earned him a call-up from the national team. First division giants River Plate and Boca Juniors displayed interest but Zanetti decided to stay on for another year at the club. In 1995, along with fellow Argentine Sebastián Rambert, he transferred to Italy's Inter Milan, becoming team owner Massimo Moratti's first-ever purchase.

Inter Milan 

As a part of the squad for 19 seasons and with 858 appearances across all competitions, he is currently the team's longest-tenured player, and the first overall – surpassing Giuseppe Bergomi (758) – in the all-time list of Inter players by most games played.

Throughout his stay with the club, he won 16 trophies, 15 of which came under his captaincy : the UEFA Cup in 1998, the 2005, 2006, 2010 and 2011 Coppa Italia, the 2005, 2006, 2008 and 2010 Supercoppa Italiana, the 2005–06, 2006–07, 2007–08, 2008–09 and 2009–10 Scudetti and the 2009–10 UEFA Champions League.

Zanetti went 12 years without being sent off in a match. The first time he was sent off in his career was on 17 February 1999 in a Coppa Italia match against Parma, but he broke his streak when he was sent off in a Serie A match against Udinese on 3 December 2011. These were the only two times he was sent off during his entire career at Inter.

At Inter, Zanetti played under 19 different coaches, making him the only player to have played under this many coaches. He has pledged his future to the Nerazzurri, hoping to have a future behind the desk at the club in his retirement from playing. "Inter means a lot to me", Zanetti said.

Early career 
Zanetti made his debut for Inter on 27 August 1995 against Vicenza in Milan. He scored Inter's second goal in their 3–0 win over compatriots Lazio in the 1998 UEFA Cup Final at the Parc des Princes in Paris, his first silverware at the club, after losing in the final in the previous season.

After two years in which he consistently wore the captain band in place of the injured Ronaldo, he was rewarded with the club captaincy in late 2001.

In August 2003, Zanetti signed a new contract with the club until June 2007.

Move to midfield 
After the arrival of Maicon at the beginning of the 2006–07 season, Zanetti was moved from the right-back position into midfield. He ended a four-year goal drought when he scored on 5 November 2006 at a home match against Ascoli, having previously scored on 6 November 2002 at an away match against Empoli. On 27 September 2006, against Bayern Munich, Zanetti played his 500th professional match for Inter and on 22 November 2006, he appeared in his 100th UEFA match, against Sporting Clube de Portugal.

Zanetti played an important role in the 2008 Supercoppa Italiana match over Roma, scoring his team's last penalty in a subsequent shootout win after the regular and extra time ended in a 2–2 draw; this was his first ever career penalty and the third Supercoppa Italiana title. Zanetti then celebrated his 600th match for Inter on 24 September 2008 with a 1–0 win over newly promoted Lecce. Minutes before the match, he was presented with a commemorative plate by former vice-captain Iván Córdoba to mark the occasion.

Though Zanetti is more often classified as a defender, he played mostly in midfield during the first half of the 2008–09 season. For the last several weeks of October 2008, with Inter coach José Mourinho facing a midfield crisis due to injuries to key midfielders Esteban Cambiasso and Sulley Muntari, he was moved again to the midfield for the matches against Genoa and Fiorentina. During that period, Mourinho played him in the midfield due to the presence of Maicon, Lúcio, Walter Samuel and Cristian Chivu in the back four.

The 2009–10 season began well for Zanetti and Inter, especially after a 4–0 thrashing of crosstown rivals A.C. Milan in the Derby della Madonnina. In the match against Genoa on 17 October, he started off the counter-attack that led to Inter's second goal after dispossessing a Genoa player. Inter became the first team of the season to win by a five-goal margin. On 24 October, he reached Giacinto Facchetti's record of 476 Serie A appearances when he turned out for the match against Catania, which ended in a 2–1 win for the Nerazzurri. He also currently holds a club record of 162 consecutive appearances.

Inter won the 2010 Champions League final 2–0 against Bayern Munich on 22 May 2010. This was Zanetti's 700th appearance for Inter, and it made him the first player to captain an Italian club to a treble of the Scudetto, Coppa Italia and Champions League.

Later career 
On 20 October 2010, at 37 years and 71 days, Zanetti became the oldest player to score in the Champions League when he netted in the opening minute of Inter's 4–3 group stage win over Tottenham Hotspur at the San Siro. This was only his second ever Champions League goal; his first came in December 1998 in a match in a 2–0 win against Sturm Graz. He scored one of Inter's goals in their 3–0 win against Seongnam Ilhwa Chunma at the 2010 FIFA Club World Cup, which they eventually won, although Inter missed out on the UEFA Super Cup that season.

On 19 January 2011, Zanetti overtook Inter legend Giuseppe Bergomi in Serie A appearances, his 520th match in Serie A, all for Inter. On 11 May 2011, Zanetti made his 1,000th appearance as a professional footballer playing for Inter against Roma in the second leg of the Coppa Italia semi-final. On 20 September 2011, Zanetti made the all-time appearance record in a Serie A clash against Novara, surpassing Giuseppe Bergomi.

On 10 March 2013, Zanetti played in his 600th Serie A match for Inter, a 1–0 loss to Bologna at the San Siro. On 21 April 2014, in the 1–0 home win against Parma, Zanetti played his 1,100th official match and became the player with the fourth-most appearances of all time.

On 29 April 2014, Inter chairman Erick Thohir announced that Zanetti would retire at the end of the 2013–14 season and become a club director. Zanetti's last competitive match at the San Siro was a 4–1 victory over Lazio on 10 May 2014. He came on as a substitute for Jonathan Moreira in the 52nd minute and wore a special armband featuring the names of every player he had played with during his career at Inter. He retired after the last game of the season, which he started as centre-back in a 2–1 away defeat to Chievo on 18 May.

Post-playing career 
In June 2014, Inter chairman Erick Thohir appointed Zanetti vice-president for a two-year term. Zanetti kept the role upon the change of ownership to the Suning Holdings Group.

On 4 May 2015, during a charitable match at the San Siro, with former and current football stars, organised by Zanetti himself for the opening celebrations for the Expo 2015 in Milan, Inter officially retired Zanetti's number 4 jersey.

International career 

Zanetti debuted for Argentina on 16 November 1994 against Chile under coach Daniel Passarella. He represented his country at the 1998 and 2002 FIFA World Cups, and was also part of the team that won the silver medal at the 1996 Summer Olympics in Atlanta, United States.

Zanetti was called up for the 1998 FIFA World Cup in France, where he made his debut in team's opening group match against Japan which finished in a 1–0 win. During the 1998 World Cup run, he neatly finished off a Juan Sebastián Verón free kick in the round of 16 match against England making the score 2–2. Argentina went on to win 4–3 on penalties but lost the quarter-final match to the Netherlands.

Zanetti represented Marcelo Bielsa's Argentina national team at the 2002 World Cup, playing in all matches, as Argentina finished third in their group, despite winning the opening match.

Zanetti celebrated his 100th cap by helping Argentina win their 2005 FIFA Confederations Cup semi-final over Mexico on 26 June 2005, in which he won the Man of the Match award.

After having been part of the team during the qualification rounds, Zanetti was not called up for the 2006 World Cup by coach José Pékerman in a controversial decision. Instead, Lionel Scaloni was given a surprise selection, a move that bewildered many fans and media.

With new coach Alfio Basile, Zanetti was called for a friendly match against France on 7 February 2007. He played brilliantly and helped Javier Saviola to score the only goal of the game that gave Argentina the first victory under Basile's second management. That same year, Zanetti was vice-captain of the Argentine squad for the 2007 Copa América, having previously appeared in the 1995, 1999 and the 2004 editions of the tournament, reaching his second consecutive Copa América final.

In April 2007, Zanetti was presented with the National Giuseppe Prisco Award. After the retirement of Roberto Ayala, Zanetti was given the captain's armband. In a World Cup qualification match against Bolivia on 17 November 2007, he became the highest capped player for Argentina.

Zanetti remained a regular under new coach Diego Maradona, although defensive midfielder Javier Mascherano took over as captain at Maradona's request. Despite winning the Champions League at club level, Zanetti and Inter teammate Esteban Cambiasso were not included in the Argentina squad for the 2010 World Cup. This move was heavily criticised by football pundits from both South America and Europe. Instead 30-year-old Ariel Garcé, who had been called up just twice in the previous five years, received a shocking selection, but ultimately did not play a single minute in any World Cup match. Zanetti's place in the starting line up was taken by Jonás Gutiérrez, who had spent the previous season playing on the wing for Newcastle United in England's second-tier Football League Championship.

On 20 August 2010, Argentina coach Sergio Batista recalled Zanetti to the squad for a friendly against Spain played on 7 September 2010 at the River Plate Monumental Stadium, where he and fellow legend Gabriel Batistuta were honored by the Argentine Football Association for their outstanding careers with more than 48,000 people giving them a standing ovation. He was called again for the friendly against Japan in Saitama of October 2010 but withdrew at the last minute due to injury.

Zanetti was a member of Argentina's squad for the 2011 Copa América on home soil, starting in all four of the team's matches as they were eliminated by Uruguay in the quarter-finals.

Style of play 

Zanetti earned the nickname El Tractor for his stamina and tireless energetic runs up and down the wings to aid both attack and defence. He was known amongst his teammates for consistency and fitness regime, which he has credited with prolonging his career. During his last few seasons, he started in over 30 games despite being in his late 30s. As a captain for both his club and international sides, he was well-respected by both fans and the opposition for his leadership, calm demeanor and conduct both on and off the pitch; in his entire 22-year career, he only received two red cards.

Zanetti was a quick, strong and physically fit player in his prime, with outstanding physical attributes, excellent ball control, dribbling, technical ability and acceleration. Defensively, he excelled at reading the game, and he was a good ball-winner and man-marker, although he was also effective at distributing the ball to teammates, due to his passing range and vision. A two-way and two-footed player, he excelled at playing on either flank, where he was capable of advancing into more offensive positions to cross balls for teammates. He also possessed an accurate shot from distance. During his later years at Inter, he was known to have developed a formidable partnership with fellow full-back Maicon, leading the club to win several titles.

Zanetti began his career as a right offensive winger, but was later moved back into midfield, where he became a tactically intelligent and versatile player, who was capable of playing anywhere in midfield or in defence. He was primarily used as a wide midfielder or as a full-back or wing-back on either flank throughout his career, although he has also been deployed as a central defender, sweeper, or as a central or defensive midfielder. He was even deployed in more offensive roles on occasion. Zanetti has been praised for his determination, consistency, and work-rate, as well as his discipline and longevity, which he has attributed to his diligence in training sessions.

Personal life 
On 23 December 1999, Zanetti married his long-time girlfriend Paula de la Fuente, the daughter of a university lecturer. They met when he was 19 and she was 14 and dated for seven years prior to their marriage. They live near Lake Como, and they also own a restaurant called El Gaucho in Milan in the Navigli district, a popular tourist area. Paula currently works as a photographer. The couple have a daughter, Sol (born 11 June 2005), and two sons, Ignacio (born 27 July 2008) and Tomás (born 9 May 2012).

Zanetti's mother, Violeta Bonazzola, died from a heart attack hours after Inter's triumph in 2011 Coppa Italia Final. He has published two autobiographies: Capitano e gentiluomo in 2010 and Giocare da uomo in 2013.

Zanetti is a devout Catholic. Upon the 2013 election of fellow Argentine Pope Francis, Zanetti was invited to the Vatican for an audience with him.

Zanetti is a close friend of Dutch footballer Wesley Sneijder, whom he inspired to convert to Catholicism.

Zanetti's elder brother Sergio is a former football defender. Javier Zanetti is not related to Cristiano Zanetti, an Italian who played alongside him for five seasons at Inter.

In 2007, Zanetti collaborated with Italian singer Mina in a Spanish cover of the song "Parole parole", found in the album Todavía.

Charity work 

Zanetti is FIFA ambassador for the SOS Children's Villages project in Argentina, and has declared his support for the Mexican Zapatista rebels.

Fundación PUPI 
Zanetti has also shown social conscience when in response to Argentina's economic crisis of 2001, which threw millions of people into poverty, Zanetti, with his wife Paula, created the Fundación PUPI in Argentina for the social integration of poor children. The aim of the organization is to help children who were left impoverished by the country's economic crisis by giving them educational opportunities, as well as taking care of their nutritional requirements. He explained:

Zanetti, along with his compatriot Esteban Cambiasso, founded this charity association to help coach young children with social isolation problems and motor coordination difficulties. Zanetti said that "this spirit lies at the base of all of Inter's initiatives for youngsters:"

Leoni di Potrero

Media 
Zanetti is featured in EA Sports' FIFA football video game series; he was included in the Ultimate Team Legends in FIFA 16.

Career statistics

Club

International 

Scores and results list Argentina's goal tally first, score column indicates score after each Zanetti goal.

Competition statistics 
Serie A: 615 appearances, 12 goals
Coppa Italia: 70 appearances, 3 goals
Supercoppa Italiana: 7 appearances
UEFA Champions League: 105 appearances, 2 goals
UEFA Cup: 53 appearances, 3 goals
FIFA Club World Cup: 2 appearances, 1 goal
FIFA World Cup: 8 appearances, 1 goal
FIFA Confederations Cup: 8 appearances
Copa América: 22 appearances

Honours 
Inter Milan
Serie A: 2005–06, 2006–07, 2007–08, 2008–09, 2009–10
Coppa Italia: 2004–05, 2005–06, 2009–10, 2010–11
Supercoppa Italiana: 2005, 2006, 2008, 2010
UEFA Champions League: 2009–10
UEFA Cup: 1997–98
FIFA Club World Cup: 2010

Argentina
Pan American Games: 1995

Individual

FIFA 100
Pirata d'Oro (Inter Milan Player of the Year): 1996
Pallone d'Argento: 2002
FIFA FIFPro World XI Nominee 2005, 2008, 2010
UEFA Team of the Year (Five-time Nominee): 2003, 2007, 2008, 2009, 2010
Premio Nazionale Carriera Esemplare "Gaetano Scirea": 2010
Konex Award Merit Diploma as one of the five best football players of the last decade in Argentina: 2010
Golden Foot: 2011, as football legend
Premio internazionale Giacinto Facchetti: 2012
Gran Galà del Calcio AIC Loyalty Award: 2012
Number 4 retired by Inter Milan as a recognition to his career at the club
Premio Gentleman Platinum Career Award: 2014
AFA Team of All Time (published 2015)
Globe Soccer Player Career Award: 2016
Inter Milan Hall of Fame: 2018
Italian Football Hall of Fame: 2018

See also 
 List of men's footballers with 100 or more international caps
 List of men's footballers with the most official appearances

References 

Notes

Citations

External links 

Javier Zanetti at BDFA.com.ar 
Profile and statistics at Football Database
Player profile at Inter's official website – inter.it

Official site of the PUPI Foundation – FundacionPUPI.org, founded by Javier and Paula Zanetti

1973 births
Living people
Sportspeople from Buenos Aires Province
Argentine people of Italian descent
Argentine people of Friulian descent
Argentine Roman Catholics
Argentine footballers
Association football utility players
Association football fullbacks
Talleres de Remedios de Escalada footballers
Club Atlético Banfield footballers
Inter Milan players
Argentine Primera División players
Serie A players
UEFA Cup winning players
UEFA Champions League winning players
Argentina international footballers
Olympic footballers of Argentina
Olympic silver medalists for Argentina
1995 King Fahd Cup players
Footballers at the 1995 Pan American Games
1995 Copa América players
Footballers at the 1996 Summer Olympics
1998 FIFA World Cup players
1999 Copa América players
2002 FIFA World Cup players
2004 Copa América players
2005 FIFA Confederations Cup players
2007 Copa América players
2011 Copa América players
Pan American Games medalists in football
Pan American Games gold medalists for Argentina
Olympic medalists in football
Medalists at the 1996 Summer Olympics
FIFA Century Club
FIFA 100
Argentine expatriate footballers
Argentine expatriate sportspeople in Italy
Expatriate footballers in Italy
Medalists at the 1995 Pan American Games